Smoking Causes Coughing is a 2022 French comedy anthology film written, shot, edited and directed by Quentin Dupieux. It stars an ensemble cast, led by Gilles Lellouche, Vincent Lacoste, Anaïs Demoustier,  and Oulaya Amamra, featuring , Adèle Exarchopoulos, Doria Tillier, Jérôme Niel, Blanche Gardin, Alain Chabat and Benoît Poelvoorde. 

The film follows the adventures of a team of five avengers (Lellouche, Lacoste, Demoustier, Zadi and Amamra) who went on compulsory retreat in order to strengthen cohesion within their group until an enemy named Lézardin (Poelvoorde) interrupts this retreat by deciding to destroy the planet Earth. Several French critics cited Teenage Mutant Ninja Turtles, Choudenshi Bioman, Tales from the Crypt, Power Rangers and Les Nuls as inspirations for the film.

Smoking Causes Coughing had its world premiere at the Cannes Film Festival on 21 May 2022 to the non-competitive Midnight Screening section. The film was released in France on 30 November 2022 by Gaumont.

Premise
After a devastating battle against a diabolical turtle, a team of five avengers—known as the Tobacco Force—is sent on a mandatory retreat to strengthen their decaying group cohesion. Their sojourn goes wonderfully well until Lézardin, Emperor of Evil, decides to annihilate planet Earth.

Cast

Release
The film premiered at the midnight section of the Cannes Film Festival on 21 May 2022.

Reception
Valerie Complex of Deadline Hollywood wrote that "The director's stories know how to take extreme violence and turn it into sarcasm and comedy, often using inanimate objects to reflect humanity's shortcomings." Guy Lodge of Variety wrote that "In this amiably trollish throwaway, Dupieux invites his characters and audience alike to chill out and take things as they come, preferably with a smoke in hand." Martin Kudlac of Screen Anarchy wrote that Dupieux "approaches the rabbit hole of meta-fictional narration with a Lewis Carrol verve." Tim Grierson of Screen Daily wrote that "It's all fairly obvious, but also pretty consistently funny."

References

External links
 
 

2022 films
2022 comedy films
2020s French films
Films directed by Quentin Dupieux
French anthology films
French comedy films
Gaumont Film Company films